Wittelsbacherbrunnen is located in Maxvorstadt, Munich, Bavaria, Germany.

Description
The Wittelsbacher fountain is a neoclassical monument located in Maximiliansplatz in the center of Munich, Bavaria, Germany. It was created between 1893 and 1895, with design by sculptor Adolf von Hildebrand and with the help of sculptor Erwin Kurz. His subject is an allegory on the primal forces of the element water. With its calm and clear design, and also from the urban point of view, the fountain is considered an accomplished artistic installation of the Bavarian capital.

Buildings and structures in Munich
Maxvorstadt